Giorgio Amitrano  (born 31 October 1957) is an Italian Japanologist, translator and essayist, specializing in Japanese language and literature.

Life and career 
Amitrano grew up in Naples, graduating from the University of Naples "L'Orientale"; his professors included Maria Teresa Orsi, Luigi Polese Remaggi and Namkhai Norbu. He won a scholarship to Tokyo in 1984. The following year he moved to Osaka, where he stayed until 1989, also teaching at Osaka University.

He currently is full professor of Japanese Literature in the Department of Asian, African and Mediterranean Studies at L'Orientale. He also presided the Faculty of Political Science of the same university, where he taught Language and Culture of Japan. In 2012, the Ministry of Foreign Affairs nominated him head of the Italian Cultural Institute in Tokyo for a five-year term.

He is the translator to Italian of the works of Banana Yoshimoto (alongside Gala Maria Follaco) and Haruki Murakami, as well as having translated some of the works of Yasunari Kawabata and Yasushi Inoue. In 2020, he was awarded membership of the Order of the Rising Sun.

As a main author, the Italian School of East Asian Studies published his volume The New Japanese Novel: Popular Culture and Literary Tradition in the Work of Murakami Haruki and Yoshimoto Banana (1996) and Feltrinelli  (1999, expanded in 2007). In 2018, he published with DeA Planeta Libri  , where he analyzes present-day Japan between tradition and modernity.

Bibliography

Translations 
 Atsushi Nakajima
  [], Marsilio, 1989
 Banana Yoshimoto
 Kitchen [], Feltrinelli, 1991
 N.P., Feltrinelli, 1993
  [], Feltrinelli, 1994
  [], Feltrinelli, 1995
 Amrita [], Feltrinelli, 1997
 Honeymoon [], Feltrinelli, 1999
 H/H [], Feltrinelli, 2001
  [], Feltrinelli, 2003
  [], Feltrinelli, 2004
  [], Feltrinelli, 2006
  [], Feltrinelli, 2008
  [], Feltrinelli, 2013
 Haruki Murakami
 Tokyo Blues [], Feltrinelli, 1993
 Dance Dance Dance [], Einaudi, 1998
  [], Einaudi, 2001
  [], Einaudi, 2005
 Norwegian Wood, Einaudi, 2006 (new edition of the translation Tokyo Blues)
  [], Einaudi, 2008
 1Q84, Einaudi, 2011
  [], illustrated by Lorenzo Ceccotti, Einaudi, 2017
 Kenji Miyazawa
  [], Marsilio, 1994
 Murasaki Shikibu
  [], Einaudi, 1992
 Yasunari Kawabata
  [], Mondadori, 2000
  [], Mondadori, 2003
  [], translated with Gala Maria Follaco, Adelphi, 2017 – edition also incorporating  []
  [Novels and Tales], Mondadori, 2003 – a compendium of selected works
 Yasushi Inoue
  [], Adelphi, 2004
  [], Adelphi, 2006
 Yukio Mishima
  [], Feltrinelli, 2022

Essays 
 The New Japanese Novel: Popular Culture and Literary Tradition in the Work of Murakami Haruki and Yoshimoto Banana, Italian School of East Asian Studies, 1996
  [The World of Banana Yoshimoto], Feltrinelli, 1999 (republished in 2007)
  [The Sound of the Mountain: a Family Falling Apart], Misuzu Shobō, 2007
   [Iro Iro: Japan Between Pop and Sublime], DeA Planeta Libri, 2018

Filmography 
 Amitrano makes a brief cameo in the role of a tour guide in the 1997 film The Vesuvians, in the segment  by Mario Martone.

See also

References 

Living people
1957 births
People from Iesi
People from Naples
Italian translators
20th-century Italian translators
21st-century Italian translators
Translators from Japanese
Translators to Italian
Italian academics
Italian essayists
Italian Japanologists
Academic staff of the Università degli Studi di Napoli "L'Orientale"
Recipients of the Order of the Rising Sun, 3rd class
Italian LGBT people